Cristoopsis poggea is a species of beetle in the family Cerambycidae, and the only species in the genus Cristoopsis. It was described by Dillon and Dillon in 1952.

References

Apomecynini
Beetles described in 1952
Monotypic Cerambycidae genera